The 20th annual World Music Awards was held on 9 November 2008 in Monaco. Awards are given based on worldwide sales figures for that year. The ceremony was hosted by actor Jesse Metcalfe and singer Michelle Williams.

Performers
Alicia Keys
Anastacia
Beyoncé
Estelle
Kate Ryan
Kid Rock
Laurent Wolf feat. Anggun
Madcon
Nancy Ajram
Solange

Nominees
Below is a list of all the nominees for each award, the winners are in bold.

World's Best Selling Record Act
Coldplay

World's Best Selling Pop Female Artist

Leona Lewis

World's Best Selling Pop Male Artist
Kid Rock

World's Best Selling Pop/Rock Female Artist
Duffy
Pink
Amy Winehouse
Katy Perry

World's Best Selling Pop/Rock Male Artist
Kid Rock
Enrique Iglesias
James Blunt
Michael Jackson

World's Best Selling Rock Act
Coldplay
Metallica
Kings of Leon
R.E.M.

World's Best Selling R&B Female
Alicia Keys
Leona Lewis
Rihanna 
Mariah Carey

World's Best Selling R&B Male
Chris Brown
Ne-Yo
Usher
Robin Thicke

World's Best Selling New R&B Act
Estelle

World's Best Selling New Act
Duffy
Leona Lewis
Estelle 
Katy Perry

World's Best Selling Hip Hop/Rap Artist
Eminem
Lil' Wayne
T.I.
T-Pain

World's Best DJ

Laurent Wolf
Martin Solveig
Tiësto
Frankie Knuckles

World's Best Selling Latin Performer
Enrique Iglesias
Gloria Estefan
Shakira
Luis Miguel

Legend Awards

Diamond Award
Ringo Starr

Outstanding Contribution to the Arts
Beyoncé

Special Achievement Award
Mariah Carey
Katy Perry

Outstanding Contribution to the Music Industry
L.A. Reid

Regional Awards
World's Best Selling African Artist: Akon
World's Best Selling American Artist: Madonna
World's Best Selling Australian Artist: Delta Goodrem
World's Best Selling Benelux Artist: Kate Ryan
World's Best Selling British Artist: Coldplay
World's Best Selling Canadian Artist: Celine Dion
World's Best Selling Chinese Artist: Jay Chou
World's Best Selling French Artist: Christophe Mae
World's Best Selling German Artist: Die Ärzte
World's Best Selling Irish Artist: The Script
World's Best Selling Italian Artist: Jovanotti
World's Best Selling Japanese Artist: Exile
World's Best Selling Middle Eastern Artist: Nancy Ajram
World's Best Selling Nigerian Artist: 2Face
World's Best Selling Norwegian Artist: Madcon
World's Best Selling Russian Artist: Filipp Kirkorov
World's Best Selling Spanish Artist: Enrique Iglesias
World's Best Selling Swedish Artist: Basshunter
World's Best selling Pop artist: Katy Perry
World's Best selling Afro artist: 2Face
World's Artist of the year: Katy Perry

International telecasts
: Channel 4

Notes

External links
Official web page

World Music Awards, 2008
Lists of World Music Award winners